Fred Golan is an American television writer and producer. Golan is best known for his work on series such as Justified and  Sneaky Pete, on which he served as a writer and executive producer.
Notable other work includes Boomtown, Roswell, and The Big Easy.

In 2013, Fred Golan was nominated by the Mystery Writers of America,  for an "Edgar Allan Poe Award" for writing Justified, Season 3 episode "Slaughterhouse."

Notable television work

The Big Easy 
That Voodoo That You Do (1.11)
Long and Short (1.15) (with Anne Kenney)
Vamps Like Us (1.20)
Heavenly Body (2.2)
A Perfect Day for Buffalo Fish (2.7)

Roswell 
Harvest (2.6)

Boomtown 
Crash (1.8)
Blackout (1.17)
Wannabe (2.3)

Justified 
The Hammer (1.10) (with Chris Provenzano)
Bulletville (1.13)
Bloody Harlan (2.13)
The Gunfighter (3.1)
Slaughterhouse (3.13)

References

External links 

American television writers
American male television writers
American television producers
Living people
Place of birth missing (living people)
Year of birth missing (living people)